Buzić Mahala is a village in the municipality of Visoko, Bosnia and Herzegovina. It is located on the western banks of the River Bosna.

Demographics 
According to the 2013 census, its population was 1,179.

References

Populated places in Visoko